Mirzapur Cadet College is a Military high school in Tangail, Bangladesh. Like other cadet colleges it  follows the national curriculum prescribed by the National Curriculum and Textbook Board (NCTB) with English version and gives emphasis to extracurricular and co-curricular activities.

Location
Mirzapur Cadet College is situated at 90°9' east longitude and 24°5.3' north latitude. The Bangshi River runs through the east side of the college and on the south and south-west side the Barinda River flows. The Footjani River joins with Barinda River at the west side. It is on the edge of Tangail District, and the nearby Kaliakair Upazila in Gazipur District HQ is 3 km from the college. The college is 8 km south of Mirzapur town, 37 km south-east from Tangail city and 58 km north-west from the capital city, Dhaka.

History
After the establishment of Faujderhat Cadet College in Chittagong district and Jhenaidah Cadet College in the Khulna division the foundation of Momenshahi Cadet College (former name of Mirzapur Cadet College) was planned. The objective of the new college was to  prepare army officers for the Pakistan Army.

East Pakistan period
The then president of Pakistan Field Marshal Ayub Khan laid the foundation stone of Momenshahi Cadet College at the Mirzapur Upazila in the then Mymensingh District (now Tangail district) of Bangladesh on 29 November 1963. The foundation stone is still there on the wall of the main academic building of the college.

Major General Fazle Mukim Khan formally opened the college on 9 January 1965. The first principal was Mr. Michael William Pitt.

Academic activities started from that year with intakes in Classes 7, 8 and 9.

Liberation War period
After 7 March speech a violent procession by an angry mob entered the college campus on the 8th. Principal Wng Comd Sulaiman Haider Kayani closed the college then and sent all the cadets home. During the liberation war the college was opened in the first week of November 1971 with Mr Wahab as acting Principal.

Bangladesh period

Each year at thousands of  7th graders compete to earn the 50 seats available. Other cadet colleges were established after liberation war. Today there are 12 cadet colleges, including three for girls only.

Academic system
Cadets are enrolled in the seventh grade and continue their study for six years. The Higher Secondary Certificate (HSC) is the final examination to pass.

Each class generally has fifty students. The Secondary School Certificate (SSC) and the Higher Secondary Certificate (HSC) examinations are administered under direct control of the Board of Education of Dhaka Division. Cadets secure top positions in board examinations each year. In this cadet college student apply for application to study .Written exam date of 2017: 6 January 2017

Departments

 Physics
 Chemistry
 Biology

 Mathematics
 Bengali
 English

 Economics
 Civics
 History

 Islamic Studies
 Arts and crafts
 Geography
 ICT

In accordance with the National Education Policy, Mirzapur offers only the science and humanities educational sections for the cadets from the 9th grade. However, the cadets are encouraged to study science.

Photo Gallery

Infrastructure

Museum

The museum is situated just beside the Arts and crafts and Geography department. Some items are:
 Pictures of the historical events regarding MCC and the cadet colleges in Bangladesh.
 A map of the college.
The curator is Naina Akhter, Head of the Department of Arts and Crafts.

Dining hall
All cadets take their meals together in the dining hall. There are separate seating facilities for the prefects and the duty master generally known as the " High Table". Five meals are served every day.Dining hall prefect from class 12 nominatated by college authority lead the dining hall.

Houses

When the academic activities of the college started on 9 January 1965, there were only two houses - Jinnah (now Fazlul Huq House) and Liaqat (now Suhrawardy House) for students' accommodation. Later Ayub House (now Nazrul House) was constructed to accommodate more students. Points are awarded to houses on the basis of different house competitions. At the end of the year house championship is determined depending on total house points.

 Fazlul Haque House: is the first house and initially  named "Jinnah House". After the independence of Bangladesh the current name was chosen. The motto of the house is Search, Struggle, Victory. The house color is blue and the symbol is a tiger. It is also called Tiger's' Den.
 Suhrawardy House: is the middle house, named after the leader of Bangladesh Hussein Shahid Suhrawardy. The house color is red. The motto of this house is "Vini Vidi Vici". Initially, the house was named "Liaqat House".
 Nazrul House: is the green house, named after the national poet of Bangladesh, Kazi Nazrul Islam. The house logo is lion and so the house is also called Lion Castle. The motto of this house is 'Ever Erect is my Head', a line of a poem of Kazi Nazrul Islam. Initially, the house was named "Ayub House".

Mosque
There is a central air conditioned mosque where all the cadets say their evening prayers. The cadets also says their Jumma prayer there.

Hospital
Mirzapur Cadet College has a hospital for cadets and for employees. A full-time doctor from the Army Medical Corps is appointed along with assistants. All the medicines are free of cost. The hospital is open 24 hours to accommodate any special needs.

Critical cases are directly referred to the Combined Military Hospital (CMH) in Saver Cantonment.

Designer

The MCC Campus was designed by the architect Mr. Thariani.

Library

The college library is named Shahid Khurshid Smriti Granthagar, after the martyr of the Liberation War of Bangladesh who was a cadet of the college. There is a portrait of Khurshid Ali on the wall of the library.

The library has 18000 books, and daily newspapers and weekly magazines are available.

Clubs and societies
 Quranic Society : Members practice recitation of the Quran and are taught principles and significance of the verses revealed to Muhammad. They also study the lifestyle of Muhammad.
 Bangla Literary and Cultural Society : Members explore Bengali literature. They practice acting by playing characters portrayed by Bengali dramatists. Also poetry recitation, debate and extempore speeches are practiced.
 English Society : The society generates enthusiasm for English language and literature and further the cadet's ability to use English. Members practice recitation, elocution, public speaking and debate.
 Geography Society
 Hiking Club 
 Photography Club
 Biology Club 
 Natural Study Club
 Physics Club 
 Chemistry Club 
 Computer Club 
 First Aid Club
 Wood Work Club
 Music Club : The members of this club practice and play instruments under the guidance of a music teacher. It includes practice on Tagore song, Nazrul song, Rural (Bangla-পল্লী) song, modern song, classical song and band song as well.
 General Knowledge and Current Affairs Club
 Arts and Crafts Club
 Robotics and Programming Club
 ROAR- Enlighten, Entertain, Encourage : ROAR is an independent public speaking platform organized on a monthly basis, by cadets

First administration
 Principal: Mr. Michael William Pitt
 Adjutant: Captain Sayed Ali Ansar
 Doctor: Dr. Hafizul Hasan
 Vice Principal: Professor A Wahab
 House Masters:
 Jinnah (now Fazlul Huq) House: Mr. Abdul Gafur
 Liaquat (now Suhrawardy) House: Mr. Saifuddin Ahmed
 Ayub (now Nazrul) House: Mr. Masud Hasan
 OIC, Dining Hall: Mr. R M M Yakub
 Senior Cadet: Jahangir Haque (also called College Captain, now entitled as College Prefect)
 College Cultural Prefect: Ziaur Rahman
 College Dining Hall Prefect: M M Matin
 House Leaders:
 Fazlul Huq House: Zia Uddin Ahmed
 Suhrawardy House: Zia Uddin Ahmed
 Nazrul House: Yousuf Habibur Rahman
 Official activities began from: 7 January 1965

Current administration
 Principal: Group Captain Md. Noor-e-Alam,afwc, psc, ATC
 Vice Principal: Mr. Md. Kamruzzaman
 Adjutant: Major Abu Saleh Md. Yahya, BIR
 Medical Officer: Capt. Md Alauddin Saddam, AMC
 OIC, Dining Hall: Md Samsuzzaman
 College Prefect: Cadet Tanbir
 House Leaders:'''
 Fazlul Huq House: Cadet Didar 
 Suhrawardy House: Cadet Hasan
 Nazrul House: Cadet Ashik

Notable alumni

Government and military
 Lieutenant General Sina Ibn Jamali,(retd), last served as Commandant of the National Defense College,
 Major General(Retd.) Md Saiful Abedin
 Atiur Rahman, economist, former governor of Bangladesh Bank, 
 General Md Abdul Mubeen, Chief of Army Staff of the Bangladesh Army.

Arts and literature 
 Alamgir, pop singer
 Shahaduz Zaman (Notable writer of Bangladesh and a medical anthropologist working at the university of Glasgow)
 G H Habib (Famous Translator and also a teacher of the University of Chittagong)

Education 
 Dr. Mahbubur Rahman Syed (Ex-Head, Department of CSE, BUET)

External links

 Mirzapur Cadet College, website maintained by Bangladesh Army

Military high schools
1963 establishments in East Pakistan
Educational institutions established in 1963
Cadet colleges in Bangladesh
Schools in Tangail District
Educational Institutions affiliated with Bangladesh Army